Sam McCluskie (11 August 1932 – 15 September 1995) was a British Labour Party politician and trade unionist.  He came from Leith in Edinburgh.  He followed Albert Booth as Treasurer of the Labour Party from 1984 to 1992.  He was general secretary of the National Union of Seamen from 1986 up to the merger which formed the RMT in 1990.  He held a post in that union but retired in 1991.

In 1988, McCluskie recorded a fundraising single with John Prescott.

References

1995 deaths
1932 births
British Merchant Navy personnel
General Secretaries of the National Union of Seamen
Scottish trade unionists
Labour Party (UK) officials
People from Leith
Chairs of the Labour Party (UK)